The Top Challenge League was a professional rugby union competition in Japan. It was the second-highest level of rugby competition in the country and is a companies league; all the teams are owned by major companies and the players are generally employees of their company. The Japan Rugby Football Union created the Top League Challenge Series in 2003 in order to give teams playing in the second-tier regional leagues a pathway to progress to the top tier Top League; this became the Top Challenge League in 2017 when a second-tier league was introduced. The competition was disbanded following the creation of the fully-professional Japan Rugby League One ahead of 2022, with the Top League and Top Challenge League being absorbed together to form one three division tournament.

History

For the 2003–04 season, a Top League competition was created as the top-tier competition in Japan, consisting of twelve teams. All remaining teams were placed in one of three regional leagues, as follows:

 Top East League, administered by the Japan East Rugby Football Union
 Top West League, administered by the Kansai Rugby Football Union
 Top Kyūshū League, administered by the Kyūshū Rugby Football Union

The Top League Challenge Series was introduced as a post-season competition for the leading teams from these three regional leagues to win promotion to the Top League for the following season.

In August 2016, the JRFU announced that the Top League Challenge Series would become a second-tier league from 2017 onwards, known as the Top Challenge League.

Format

Between 2003–04 and 2016–17, the Top League Challenge Series consisted of two divisions – the Challenge 1 and the Challenge 2 series. The three teams that won the regional leagues progressed to the Challenge 1 series, while the runners-up progressed to the Challenge 2 series. In both divisions, teams played in a round-robin format to determine the final standings.

While the exact format varied from season to season, a number of top-placed teams in the Challenge 1 won automatic promotion to the next season's Top League each season, while the next-best teams qualified for promotion play-off matches against teams that finished towards the bottom of that season's Top League. The top teams from Challenge 2 would either qualify to the promotion play-off matches, or progress to the same season's Challenge 1 series.

Seasons

The following Top League Challenge Series were played as post-season play-offs:

The following Top Challenge League seasons were played as a round-robin league:

See also

 Top League
 Japan Company Rugby Football Championship

References

External links
 
 
 
 
 

 
Rugby union leagues in Japan
Sports leagues established in 2003
2003 establishments in Japan
Professional sports leagues in Japan